Peter Christian Knudsen (in Danish known as P. Knudsen) (1848, Randers – 1910, Copenhagen) was the leader of the Danish Social Democratic party from 1882 to 1910 resigning a few months before his death. Knudsen served on the Copenhagen City Council from 1897 to 1902. He was a member of the Danish parliament (Folketinget) in 1898–1901 and 1902–1909.

References

Skou, Kaare, R. (2005). Dansk politik A–Å . Aschehoug, p. 376. .

1848 births
1910 deaths
19th-century Copenhagen City Council members
Members of the Folketing
People from Randers
Leaders of the Social Democrats (Denmark)